Keerati Mahaplearkpong, nicknamed Gypsy, is a Thai actress and singer born on 12 August 1987 in Bangkok, Thailand). Her younger sister Arikantha Mahaphruekpong is also an actress.

Works

Filmography

TV Drama

Sitcoms/Series

Music videos

Advertisements 
 Kendo Biscuits
 Farmhouse Sliced Bread
 Sugus soft candy
 TrueMove H
 Brand's Veta Prune
 Sheene Oil Free Cake Powder
 Nokia smartphone 700
 Pepsi

References

External links
 
 
 เฟสบุ๊คแฟนเพจยิปซี - Fanpage
 

1987 births
Living people
Keerati Mahaplearkpong
Keerati Mahaplearkpong
Keerati Mahaplearkpong
Keerati Mahaplearkpong
Keerati Mahaplearkpong
Keerati Mahaplearkpong
Keerati Mahaplearkpong
Keerati Mahaplearkpong